Gymnopilus subpenetrans is a species of mushroom in the family Hymenogastraceae.

See also

List of Gymnopilus species

External links
Gymnopilus subpenetrans at Index Fungorum

subpenetrans
Taxa named by William Alphonso Murrill